Edward Danforth Eddy (May 10, 1921 – June 28, 1998) was an American educator and college administrator. He was born at Saratoga Springs, New York. He attended Cornell University, where he received a B.A. in humanities in 1944, and earned a Master of Divinity degree from Yale University in 1946. At Cornell, he was editor-in-chief of The Cornell Daily Sun and a member of the Quill and Dagger society. He went on to receive a Ph.D. from Cornell in 1956. He started his career as associate director of Cornell's interfaith office in 1946.

From 1949 to 1960, he was associated with the University of New Hampshire. He was the Assistant to the President from 1949 to 1954, then served as acting president in 1954 and 1955. From 1955 to 1960, he was the provost and a vice president. He left UNH in 1960 to assume the presidency of Chatham College in Pittsburgh. In 1977 he was appointed Provost of Pennsylvania State University. In 1983, he was selected as the ninth president of the University of Rhode Island. He held that position until his retirement in 1991.

References

1921 births
1998 deaths
Cornell University alumni
Yale Divinity School alumni
University of New Hampshire faculty
Chatham University faculty
Pennsylvania State University faculty
University of Rhode Island faculty
Presidents of the University of Rhode Island
20th-century American academics